Mademoiselle de Belle-Isle is a 1905 opera by Spyridon Samaras to a French-language libretto by Paul Milliet based on the 1839 play by Alexandre Dumas. The opera was however premiered in Italian at Genoa with a new Italian text by Amintore Galli.<ref>{{cite book|publisher=|title=Cronologie, saggi, testimonianze|author1=Mario Morini|author2=Nandi Ostali|author3=Piero Ostali|year=1995|page=763|quote=Mademoiselle de Nelle-Isle, commedia lirica in quattro atti libretto di Paul Milliet (dall' omonima commedia di Alexandre Dumas) versione ritmica italiana di Amintore Galli prima rappresentazione Politeama di Genova, 8 novembre ...}}</ref>

RecordingMademoiselle de Belle-Isle'' (French version) Angelo Simos, Tassis Christoyannis, Pavlos Maropoulos, Pantelis Kontos, Kaval Choir of Sofia, Pazardzhik Symphony Orchestra, Byron Fidetzis Naxos 2CD 2020

References

External links

1905 operas
Operas by Spyros Samaras
French-language operas
Operas based on plays
Operas based on works by Alexandre Dumas
Operas